Wayfarers was a non-profit studio program and art gallery in Bushwick, Brooklyn, New York founded by American artist George Ferrandi. The venue existed between 2011 and 2020 with a front gallery that faced DeKalb street that had rotating exhibitions, as well as studios for member artists, a commons area and additional exhibition space in the back.  Wayfarers featured a wide range of programming including regular exhibitions by member and guest artists, pop-up exhibitions, performances, readings, editions, a summer artist-in-residence program, and an international exhibition exchange program.

Exhibitions

2015 Eulogy for the Dyke Bar 
In 2015, Chicago-based artist Macon Reed featured her installation art "Eulogy for the Dyke Bar" at Wayfarers. Composed of cardboard, plaster, and wood, it was a life-size depiction of a gay bar representing the declining phenomenon of the LGBT community. In March 2016, the exhibition was again featured in the Pulse Contemporary Art Fair.

Exhibited Artists 
Wayfarers has exhibited local and national artists including John Orth, Macon Reed, Christy Gast, David (Scout) McQueen, Hiroki Otsuka, Serra Victoria Bothwell Fels, Ryan Crowley, Charlotte Evans, and many more.

References

External links 
 

2011 establishments in New York City
Art museums and galleries in Brooklyn
Art galleries established in 2011
Bushwick, Brooklyn